Mortal Engines is a 2001 novel by Philip Reeve.

Mortal Engines may also refer to:
Mortal Engines (film), a 2018 film based on the novel
Mortal Engines Quartet, the series of which Reeve's book is a part
Mortal Engines (Lem), a collection of short stories by Stanislaw Lem